William Anthony Hughes (September 23, 1921 – February 7, 2013) was an American prelate of the Catholic Church. He served as Bishop of Covington from 1979 to 1995.

Biography
William Hughes was born in Youngstown, Ohio, to James and Anna (née Philbin) Hughes, who were Irish immigrants. After attending Ursuline High School in Youngstown, he studied at St. Charles College in Catonsville, Maryland, from where he graduated summa cum laude. He returned to Ohio and completed his theological studies at St. Mary Seminary in Cleveland. He was ordained to the priesthood by Bishop James A. McFadden on April 6, 1946.

He then served as a curate at St. Charles Church in Boardman and St. Joseph Church in Massillon. In 1956 he earned a Master's degree in Education from the University of Notre Dame. Hughes was the founding principal of Cardinal Mooney High School from 1956 until 1965, when he became superintendent of Catholic schools and vicar for education in the Diocese of Youngstown. He was raised to the rank of Monsignor by Pope John XXIII in 1961.

On July 23, 1974, Hughes was appointed Auxiliary Bishop of Youngstown and Titular Bishop of Inis Cathaigh by Pope Paul VI. He received his episcopal consecration on the following September 12 from Bishop James William Malone, with Archbishop Joseph Bernardin and Bishop William Michael Cosgrove serving as co-consecrators, at St. Columba's Church. Following the resignation of Richard Henry Ackerman, Hughes was named the eighth Bishop of Covington, Kentucky, on April 13, 1979. He was installed at the Cathedral Basilica of the Assumption on the following May 8. During his tenure, he was criticised for inviting pro-choice figures, such as Rep. Robert Drinan, S.J., and actress Marlo Thomas to speak at church-sponsored events, and for saying Mass for gays and lesbians at Chicago in 1992. Within the United States Conference of Catholic Bishops, he served as chairman of the Subcommittee on Spiritual Renewal and Continuing Education.

After sixteen years as Bishop of Covington, Hughes resigned on July 4, 1995. He was succeeded by Bishop Robert William Muench, who was later appointed Bishop of Baton Rouge, Louisiana.

References

Episcopal succession

1921 births
2013 deaths
People from Youngstown, Ohio
University of Notre Dame alumni
St. Charles College alumni
Saint Mary Seminary and Graduate School of Theology alumni
American people of Irish descent
Roman Catholic bishops of Covington
Bishops of Iniscathay
Catholics from Ohio